Meltzer Woods consists of  of old-growth forest located in Central Indiana.  The woods have been included in Indiana's Classified Forest Program since 1928. They are currently protected by the Meltzer family in partnership with the Central Indiana Land Trust. The woods were designated a National Natural Landmark in 1973.

History

 1857 - John Frederick Meltzer purchases the first  of farm land
 1920 - Brady Meltzer (John's son) and Philip Meltzer (grandson) make additional purchases.  The farm now totals .
 1928 -  of the Meltzer farm that were never cleared are added to Indiana's Classified Forest Program
 1973 - Designated a National Natural Landmark

Threats

Purple winter creeper (Euonymus fortunei) and garlic mustard (Alliaria petiolata) currently threaten the forest.  It is expected to take thousands of hours of labor to control these invasive species.

References

External links
 "Working with Giants: Meltzer Woods"
 Central Indiana Land Trust

National Natural Landmarks in Indiana
Protected areas of Shelby County, Indiana
Forests of Indiana